Town Hall Theatre is a theater group operated by Washington Township's recreation department in Old Town Hall, located in the historic downtown of Centerville and Washington Township, Montgomery County, Ohio.

History
Built in 1908 as Washington Township Hall, the building previously served as the seat of the Washington Township, Montgomery County, Ohio government, providing meeting space for township trustees and a central hub for community activities such as graduations and public performances. It served as the Washington Township government offices until 1985.

In 1989, the township decided to turn the Centerville, Ohio landmark into a performing art center. With the help of a grant, the All Children's Theatre was formed in 1991. Between 1992 and 1996, the building was renovated, resulting in a newly refurbished auditorium, lobby, and rehearsal room, as well as the installation of an accessible ramp entrance and restrooms, a dance studio, and a scene shop.

Town Hall Theatre is dedicated to the presentation of theater for young audiences and presents about eight to ten shows per season. It does this through the three producing arms of All Children's Theatre. The Landmark Children's Theatre Company features professional adult actors performing alongside volunteer community adult performers and youth. The All Children's Theatre features large, all-ages cast shows ranging from grades 2–12. The ACT Touring Teens feature high school students grades 7–12 performing on an in-school tour. In addition to the production schedule, the theatre offers classes in acting, dance, and music. The Town Hall is owned by the Washington Township Recreation Center, which sponsors performing arts summer camps at the theatre.

Each year, the Town Hall Theatre performs for over 20,000 audience members and involves over 400 community volunteers in every facet of its productions.

In 2019, a disagreement arose between the city of Centerville and Washington Township regarding how to use the open space adjacent to the theater, with the Township preferring to keep it as green space. Both parties bid on the property; Centerville won the bid.

Seasons

2012–2013 "Tales Old and New" Season
Disney's The Little Mermaid Jr.
Duck for President
'Twas the Night Before Christmas
Lilly's Purple Plastic Purse
Rapunzel! Rapunzel! A Very Hairy Tale
Disney's Beauty and the Beast Jr.

2011–2012 "Kids Take Flight" Season
Disney's Camp Rock the Musical
Gooney Bird Greene
Pinkalicious the Musical
Frosty the Snowman
Click Clack Moo: Cows that Type
How I Became a Pirate
The Musical Adventures of Flat Stanley Jr.

2010–2011 "Character Counts" Season
Disney's Alice in Wonderland Jr.
The True Story of the Three Little Pigs
Junie B Jones: Jingle Bells Batman Smells
The Berenstain Bears Onstage
Pinkalicious, The Musical
The Phantom Tollbooth
Honk Jr.

2009–2010 "Dreams Come True" Season
Disney's High School Musical and High School Musical 2
Junie B. Jones: And a Little Monkey Business
Disney's Geppetto and Son
Winnie the Pooh
Madeline and the Gypsies
Stellaluna
Disney's Cinderella and Sleeping Beauty

2008–2009 "Pure Imagination" Season
How to Eat Like a Child
Disney's 101 Dalmatians/The Aristocats
Brave Little Tailor
Madeline's Christmas
Brave Irene
James and the Giant Peach
If You Give a Mouse a Cookie
Willy Wonka

2007–2008 "We're all in this together" Season
Disney's High School Musical
The Best Christmas Pageant Ever
Bridge to Terabithia
A year with Frog and Toad
The Stinky Cheese Man  and Other Fairly Stupid Tales
Disney's Mulan
Nate the Great
Miss Nelson has a Field Day
Where The Red Fern Grows

2006–2007 “Oh the Thinks you can Think” Season
Schedule for the current season:
The Frog Prince, September 7–10, 2006 (Rec' West) 
The Little Mermaid, September 28October 15, 2006
The Cay, November 2–5, 2006 (Rec' West)
A Little Princess, December 1–17, 2006
Miss Nelson is Missing, January 11–21, 2007 (Rec' West)
Seussical, March 16April 1, 2007 
Lily's Purple Plastic Purse, April 12–15, 2007  (Rec' West)
The Trumpet of the Swan, May 3–20, 2007

References

External sites

Theatres in Ohio
Theatre company production histories